Daniel Armen Janjigian (born April 30, 1972) is an Armenian-American former bobsledder, former actor, and political candidate. He competed at the 
2002 Winter Olympics, representing Armenia. He earned 33rd place in the two-man bobsleigh event with Yorgo Alexandrou. As an actor, he portrayed Chris-R in the 2003 cult film The Room.

Biography

Early life
Janjigian was born on April 30, 1972 in Chicago, Illinois. His ancestors, ethnic Armenians from Samsun and Trabzon in modern-day Turkey, survived the Armenian genocide and subsequently emigrated to the United States. He was raised in Saratoga, California, his parents running an Armenian restaurant in nearby Sunnyvale. He graduated from Saratoga High School in 1991, later graduating with a degree in business administration from California Polytechnic State University in San Luis Obispo in 1996. After graduating, he worked at Microsoft for a number of years.

2002 Winter Olympics
Janjigian developed an interest for bobsledding after meeting Greek Olympic bobsledder John-Andrew Kambanis at a mutual friend's wedding and attending the Olympic Bobsledding School in Calgary, Alberta, Canada. He, along with Yorgo Alexandrou, competed in the two-man bobsleigh event at the 2002 Winter Olympics in Salt Lake City, Utah for Armenia. Originally, Janjigian's brakeman was going to be Ara Bezdjian, but he had to be replaced due to a back injury. He then recruited a weightlifting champion from Armenia, but his visa application was cancelled in the aftermath of the September 11 attacks. Despite both being American citizens and Alexandrou being of Greek descent rather than of Armenian descent, they were granted Armenian residency in order to be eligible to participate. They notably practiced on the streets of San Jose, California on a bobsled fitted with wheels, which commentators noted was reminiscent of the famous Jamaican bobsledding team at the 1988 Winter Olympics. This was due to the lack of a proper venue that was available for them to train in as well as financial constraints. They finished in 5th place in the qualifying rounds, only qualifying in their last run. Despite garnering media attention nationally, Janjigian and Alexandrou finished 33rd in the actual event.

Acting career
After the Olympics, Janjigian began a career in acting. His most notable work is that of portraying the violent drug dealer Chris-R in the 2003 cult film The Room. His debut acting role, Janjigian was the roommate of the actor originally cast to play Mark, a man only identified as Dan (or Don, as director Tommy Wiseau mistakenly referred to him). He was suggested despite the suggestion by Wiseau to cast Scott Holmes, who had already portrayed the character Mike within the film, to play Chris-R with a disguise so as to distinguish him from his original character.

His other works include the Seth Landau film Take Out, as well as a mockumentary about the whereabouts of actors from The Room 15 years after the film's release, The Room Actors: Where Are They Now?, directed by Robyn Paris, who played Michelle in The Room. He also appeared in a 2013 episode of Wheel of Fortune. In the 2017 movie adaptation of The Disaster Artist, a book by fellow actor Greg Sestero about the making of The Room, Janjigian is portrayed by Zac Efron.

Political career
In September 2019, Janjigian filed to run as a Democrat for the U.S. House of Representatives in the 2020 election. He was campaigning to be the Democratic nominee against Republican incumbent John Carter to represent the 31st district, based in the Austin metro area. Janjigian was ultimately eliminated in the primaries. Janjigian endorsed computer engineer Donna Imam over physician Christine Eady Mann in the primary runoff. Two of his other primary opponents, singer-songwriter Eric Hanke and Round Rock councilwoman Tammy Young, also endorsed Imam, who would go on to win the runoff and lose in the general election to Carter.

Personal life
As of February 2020, Janjigian is a sales and management consultant and lives in Leander, Texas with his wife and three children, having moved to the Austin area in 2005. He speaks fluent Armenian and holds dual citizenship in Armenia and the United States. He authored sections of the 2015 Jack Canfield book The Soul of Success Volume 2.

Filmography

Film

Television

References

External links

Dan Janjigian's Olympic statistics at Sports Reference

1972 births
Living people
American people of Armenian descent
Male actors from Chicago
Bobsledders from Chicago
Male actors from Austin, Texas
Sportspeople from Austin, Texas
People from Saratoga, California
People from Leander, Texas
American male bobsledders
Bobsledders at the 2002 Winter Olympics
Olympic bobsledders of Armenia
Armenian male bobsledders
Ethnic Armenian sportspeople
California Polytechnic State University alumni
California Democrats
Texas Democrats
Contestants on American game shows
Microsoft employees